Cornus controversa (wedding cake tree), syn. Swida controversa, is a species of flowering plant in the genus Cornus of the dogwood family Cornaceae, native to China, Korea, the Himalayas and Japan. Ovate dark green leaves ( long) are glaucous underneath and turn red-purple in autumn. It is cultivated in gardens and parks in temperate regions.

It is also sometimes referred to as Bothrocaryum controversum  when seeds are offered for online sale.

The variety C. controversa 'Variegata' has leaves with cream margins, which turn yellow in autumn, and grows to a lesser size than its parent – typically . It has gained the Royal Horticultural Society's Award of Garden Merit.

Gallery

References

controversa
Flora of temperate Asia
Trees of Myanmar
Trees of Nepal
Trees of Vietnam
Plants described in 1909